Ethnikos Gymnastikos Syllogos or Ethnikos Athens is one of the oldest multi-sports clubs in Greece. It was founded in 1893.

History

1896 Olympics

It had a team of gymnasts competing at the 1896 Summer Olympics in Athens.

The team's leader was Ioannis Chrysafis.  Members included Ioannis Mitropoulos, Dimitrios Loundras, Filippos Karvelas, and 15 others whose names are unknown.

The team placed third of the three teams in the parallel bars team event, earning a bronze medal (retroactively awarded by the International Olympic Committee, as the awards at the first Olympic Games differed from the gold, silver, bronze format used later).

Football trophies
Panhellenic Football Championship
Winner (2): 1906, 1907

Titles 
Men's Athletics:
21 Greek Championships: ( 1901, 1910, 1920, 1925, 1926, 1927, 1928, 1930, 1931, 1937, 1938, 1939, 1940, 1946, 1947, 1948, 1949, 1950, 1951, 1953, 1954) 
6 Greek Cross Country Championships: (1908, 1910, 1911, 1912, 1926, 1927)
Women's Athletics:
1 Greek Championship: (1975) 
1 Greek Cross Country Championship: (1982)
Shooting:
1 Greek Championship: (1937)
Men's Boxing:
2 Greek Championships: (1961, 1981)
Women's Boxing:
1 Greek Championships: (2013)
Men's Greco-Roman Wrestling:
35 Greek Championships, Men: (1936, 1937, 1938, 1939, 1940, 1946, 1947, 1948, 1949, 1950, 1951, 1952, 1958, 1960, 1962,[2] 1964, 1965, 1966, 1968, 1969, 1971, 1973, 1974, 1975, 1977, 1978, 1979, 1980, 1981, 1982[3], 1984, 1985, 1986, 1987, 1988) (record)
Men's Free Wrestling:
4 Greek Championships, Men: (1958, 1959, 1960, 1966)
Judo:
5 Greek Championships, Men: (1993, 1995, 1996, 1998, 2001)

See also
1905–06 Ethnikos G.S. Athens season
1906–07 Ethnikos G.S. Athens season

Multi-sport clubs in Athens
Gymnastics at the 1896 Summer Olympics
Athletics clubs in Greece
Olympic bronze medalists for Greece